The 1985 UCF Knights football season was the seventh for the team. It was the first for Gene McDowell as the head coach of the Knights. The team finished with a 4–7 overall record.

The Knights competed as an NCAA Division II Independent. The team played their home games at the Citrus Bowl in Downtown Orlando

Schedule

References

UCF
UCF Knights football seasons
UCF Knights football